Deepu Pradeep (born 12 November 1989) is an Indian script writer active in the Malayalam film industry.

Career 
Deepu began his career as a blogger in 2007 and has written various short stories on his blog. It was after reading his short story named 'Glass Story' that director Basil Joseph approached him for writing the screenplay for his debut movie.

By then he had already written the screenplay for two short films: 'Athekaranathaal' and 'Unnimoolam'. The screenplay for his first movie Kunjiramayanam was based on 5 short stories posted in his blog. 'Paathirathriyile Premam (2010), 'Salsamukku (2011), 'Just Married (2012), Cut Piece kuttan (2012), Gundakal Karayaarilla (2013). 

His debut movie Kunjiramayanam became successful in Kerala. His second movie as script writer was The Priest. The script was cowritten with Shyam Menon and the movie was released in March 2021 across theaters in Kerala.

Filmography

Short films

Feature films

References

Further reading

External links
 

Malayalam screenwriters
1989 births
Living people
Indian male screenwriters
Screenwriters from Kerala
People from Malappuram district